Matthias Koops (active 1789–1805) was a British paper-maker who invented the first practical processes for manufacturing paper from wood pulp, straw, or recycled waste paper, without the necessity of including expensive linen or cotton rags.

Koops was born in Pomerania, the son of Matthias and Katherina Dorothea Koops. By 1789 he had emigrated to England, for he leased a house in Edmonton, London, that year. In 1790 married Elizabethe Jane Austen at St Marylebone Parish Church. He was naturalized on 1 April 1790.

From 1800-1801, Koops operated the Neckinger Mill in Bermondsey, London, where he experimented with making paper from straw, hay, wood pulp, recycled paper, and other items, without the necessity of cloth. In 1801, Koops was granted two patents for these inventions, issued on 17 February and 18 May. These patents granted him the "sole privilege of making paper from straw, hay, thistles, waste and refuse of hemp and flax, and different kinds of wood and bark" for a period of 14 years. In February 1801, he conveyed fractional ownership of shares in these inventions to James Stevenson and other individuals, and that same year launched the Straw Paper Manufacturing Company at Millbank. This company was at the vanguard of industrial paper-making, with its steam engine by John Rennie the Elder, Hollander beaters and at least one hydraulic press for squeezing water from the paper.

However, Koops had been declared bankrupt a decade earlier, on 30 June 1790, and still owed considerable sums to his creditors. These creditors settled with Koops in 1801, but claimed that they had not received their promised settlements, and on 14 October 1802, entered Koop's dwelling house and factory and seized and sold all contents. Furthermore, they claimed full rights to his patents, and thus disputed the fractional shares owned by Stevenson and others. (They won the subsequent lawsuit.)

On Christmas Day 1803, the Straw Paper Manufactury's proprietors were served notice for failure to pay rent, and in 1804 the factory was sold at auction. As a last measure, on 28 December 1805, the Straw Paper Manufactury's proprietors paid £1,000 to Koops' creditors, but in the end Koops was again declared bankrupt on 25 June 1812. He appears to have died before 1815.

Written works 
 Historical account of the substances which have been used to describe events, and to convey ideas, from the earliest date, to the invention of paper, 1801, printed on paper made from wood shavings.

References 

 Patent No. 2392, "Extracting Ink from Paper and Converting such Paper into Pulp", April 28, 1800
 Patent No. 2481, "Specifications of the Patent Granted to Matthias Koops - for Manufacturing Paper from Straw, Hay, Thistles, Waste and Refuse of Hemp and Flax, and Different Kinds of Wood and Bark, Fit for Printing", February 17, 1801
 Patents for inventions. Abridgments of specifications, Patent Office, 1858, pages 11–12.
 "Hesse v. Stevenson", in Reports of Cases Argued and Determined in the Court of Common Pleas, and Other Courts: From Easter Term, 36 Geo. III. 1796, to [Hilary Term 44 Geo. III. 1804] ... Both Inclusive: with Tables of the Cases and Principal Matters, Oliver D. Cooke, 1826, Volume 3, pages 565-578.
 "Matthias Koops", Oxford Dictionary of National Biography.
 Oxford Index entry
 "William Blake and the Straw Paper Manufactory at Millbank" by Keri Davies, in Blake in Our Time: Essays in Honour of G.E. Bentley Jr, ed. Karen Mulhallen, University of Toronto Press, 2010, pages 235-261.

English inventors